The Palace of the Marquis of Santa Cruz is a 16th-century Italian-style building in Viso del Marqués, Spain.

History and description 
The palace was built on behalf of Álvaro de Bazán, 1st Marquis of Santa Cruz. The project, that reportedly kickstarted on 15 November 1564, was participated by the Italian architects Juan Baptista Bergamasco and Juan Baptista Olamasquín. The interior was decorated with mouldings, doorways, fireplaces and frescoes, following the Genoese aesthetics. The collection of frescoes has been noted among the highlights of the Spanish Renaissance. The palace was declared national historic-artistic monument in 1931.

Since 1950, the building houses the premises of the General Archive of the Spanish Navy.

References 
Citations

Bibliography
 
 
 

Buildings and structures completed in the 16th century
Bien de Interés Cultural landmarks in the Province of Ciudad Real
Buildings and structures in the Province of Ciudad Real
Renaissance architecture in Spain